Fright Night is the first studio album by the power metal band Stratovarius, released in May 1989 by Columbia Records. A remastered edition was issued in 1993.

Critical reception

Antti J. Ravelin at AllMusic gave Fright Night 2.5 stars out of 5, describing it as lacking variety and criticising the band for not playing particularly well together. He nonetheless recommended the album for fans of 1980s heavy rock, saying that it was an important part of Stratovarius' discography.

Track listing

Personnel
Timo Tolkki – vocals, guitar, production
Antti Ikonen – keyboards, production
Tuomo Lassila – drums, production
Jyrki Lentonen – bass guitar, production
Make Törrönen – engineering
Mika Jussila – remastering (reissue)

Charts

References

External links
Fright Night at stratovarius.com

Stratovarius albums
1989 debut albums
Columbia Records albums